Koh-e-Taftan Railway Station (Balochi: کوہی تفتان اسٹیشن) (or Kūh-i-Taftān) is in Taftan a dry, elevated, mountainous town in Pakistan. The country's most western station, it is the last station in Pakistan on the Quetta-Taftan Railway Line before crossing into Iran and serves the town notable for the east-west trunk road. It is in the western projection of the far western province, Balochistan.

The border, less than 700 metres west, on the line sits at approximately 61.54° east, whereas Pakistan's easternmost station, Chak Amru, in Punjab, lies in an upper valley at about 75.2° east (of the Prime Meridian).

See also
 List of railway stations in Pakistan
 Pakistan Railways

References

Railway stations on Quetta–Taftan Railway Line
Railway stations in Chaghi District
Railway stations in Balochistan, Pakistan